The Nightingale House is a Victorian era Queen Anne and Eastlake style house, located at 201 Buchanan Street in San Francisco, California, United States.

History 
The 4400 square foot home was designed by architect John Marquis and built in 1882.  The name comes from its original owner, John Nightingale (1823–1912). The structure was designated as a San Francisco landmark in October 1972.

Notably the last resident of this house was San Francisco Arts Commissioner and San Francisco artist Jo Hanson, who died March 13, 2007.

See also
 List of San Francisco Designated Landmarks
 Lower Haight neighborhood

References

Houses in San Francisco
San Francisco Designated Landmarks
Western Addition, San Francisco
Bliss and Faville buildings
Queen Anne architecture in California
Stick-Eastlake architecture in California